A rondo is a type of game, similar to keep away, that is used as a training drill in association football (soccer). In a rondo, one group of players is tasked with keeping possession of the ball while completing a series of passes, while a smaller group of players (sometimes a single player) tries to take possession.

Rondos take place in close proximity, with the possessing group often circled around the opposing group. Unlike other possession games, in a rondo, players occupy predetermined positions. Rondos are said to improve player decision making, coordination, team play, creativity, competitiveness, and physical conditioning. The exercise has been used by major football organizations, including Derby County F.C. in the early 70's, and later FC Barcelona and Ajax, and has been credited with remaking the modern game.

Dutch player and coach Johan Cruyff, who implemented the rondo at Barcelona, described the drill: "Everything that goes on in a match, except shooting, you can do in a rondo. The competitive aspect, fighting to make space, what to do when in possession and what to do when you haven’t got the ball, how to play ‘one touch’ soccer, how to counteract the tight marking and how to win the ball back."

References

External links
Video of a rondo being played by FC Barcelona

Association football variants
Sports education and training
Johan Cruyff